The Verschoyle family was a prominent Irish landed family of Dutch descent. The surname is pronounced in Ireland as "Ver-Skoil" and in England as "Ver-Shoy-Ul".

History

The family of Verschoyle (Verschuyl) were Dutch Huguenots who emigrated from the Netherlands to Ireland in 1568, having suffered from religious persecution due. Other accounts state that they travelled to Ireland with William of Orange, and later married into ancient Irish clans. The family coat of arms features three boars heads on a chevron, with the motto , which roughly translates as "steadfast and constrained".

Pedigree

According to the pedigree in Gens Van Der Scuylen, 600 years of Verschoyle history, with information added from Burke's Landed Gentry, the following lineage is described:

Early in the 17th century two of the name said to be brothers, Henrik and William, were resident in Dublin. Henrik Verschoyle, of Thomas Street, Dublin; married Judith, to whom he devised a share of his goods jointly with his two children (listed below), and died 1623. William Verschoyle, married Catherine van Pilkam, and died 1648, leaving a share of his property to his nephew Henry (see below) and his niece Catherine (married — Cotton).

 Henry Verschoyle, Freeman of Dublin 1659.
 Robert Verschoyle, Freeman of Dublin 1676; had:
 Henry Verschoyle
 Katherine. Married as his 2nd wife Sir Robert Newcomen, 4th Bt, of Kenagh, County Longford (died 1668)

Henry Verschoyle, of Dolphin's Barn and Donore, County Dublin; Freeman of Dublin 1718; married 1st —; married 2nd 21 August 1703 Martha Eskrigg, of Dublin, and died (will dated 1731, proved 1734), having had:

 Joseph Verschoyle
 William Verschoyle
 Thomas Verschoyle
 Hannah Verschoyle. Married Mr. Carmichael.
 Elizabeth Verschoyle. Married 1739 James Cartland, of Dublin.

Joseph Verschoyle, of Donore; born 1708; educated Trinity College Dublin (BA); Freeman 1746; Senior Master Trin Guild, Gov of Bluecoat Hosp 1759, JP, married 8 December 1744 Margaret Mottley, of Dublin, and died May 1796, leaving:

 James Verschoyle
 Richard Verschoyle died without issue August 1827. Married Barbara Fagan.
 John Verschoyle born 1752. Married 1st 16 July 1782, Henrietta, daughter of William Preston.

The Rt. Rev. Dr. James Verschoyle LLB (1776) LLD (1798) Trinity College Dublin.
Bishop of Killala and Achonry, and minor Canon of St. Patrick's Cathedral. Resident Killala, Ireland. Born 1750. As a member of the Privy Council, he may have been a member of the Irish House of Lords, although few records are available. Married Frances Walsh on 8 April 1780. Died 13 April 1837, leaving issue

 Joseph Verschoyle
 Robert Verschoyle
 Henry Verschoyle
 Augustus Verschoyle
 Henry William Verschoyle

Rev. Joseph Verschoyle MA, Trinity College, Cambridge. Resident Roundwood, County Laois, Ireland.
Rector of Kilmoreny. Married Catherine Hickie Jephson, granddaughter of Henry Prittie, 1st Baron Dunalley, through the female line. Catherine was the daughter of Lorenzo Hickie Jephson. They had the following issue:

 Henry James Prittie Verschoyle
 Martha Matilda Verschoyle
 James Lorenzo Verschoyle (married Caroline di Serravalle, Countess of Assereto and only child of Marquis of Assereto)
 Emily Salisbury Verschoyle
 Robert Henry Verschoyle (married Gertrude Mary Walker)
 Richard Jephson Verschoyle

The retention of the name "Prittie" as a middle name reflects the seniority of the female family which was married into the Verschoyles. The name Lorenzo has also been added in recognition of James's grandfather.

Captain James Lorenzo Verschoyle, of the 66th Regiment (now Royal Berkshires) 1832-1875, married  Countess Caroline d'Assereto - the only child of the Marquis d'Assereto, and under normal rules the eldest child or next in line for the title is styled one below in the peerage rank, from the father, hence being a countess. Upon the death of the father, her title should have reverted to marchioness, although there is no documentation. In the 1920s, Italy changed the regulations stating that females could not inherit Italian titles, however, her lifetime was before this date. They had the following issue:

 Louis Charles Hamilton Massey Verschoyle
 Robert Verschoyle
 Theodore Stuart Robert Verschoyle (married to Emily Margaret Pierce McClellan)
 James Joseph Verschoyle
 George Moutray Verschoyle

Theodore Verschoyle had the following issue:

Brian Stuart Verschoyle (married Mary Jane Chambers) Who owned the manor house of Mountainy, Lacca, Mountrath, County Laois. He was a farmer. He is the last hereditary Freeman of the City of Dublin in this line. He had the following issue:
 Theodore Stuart Robert Verschoyle (born 1 November 1921)
 James Verschoyle (born and died 1 November 1921)
 Robert Verschoyle d young
 Doreen Verschoyle d young
 Emily Verschoyle
 Kathleen Verschoyle (now Kathleen Alexander) currently manages the farming estate with her son
 Patricia Verschoyle
 Charlotte Verschoyle (now Charlotte Heath)

Theodore Stuart "John" Verschoyle was born on 1 November 1921. As he was born at a period when Ireland was still under British rule, he technically would have been a Freeman of the City of Dublin, through descent, had this continued to be the case when he was 18. He died on 25 July 2007 at Midland Regional Hospital, Portlaoise. His life partner Kathleen was born on 16 February 1922, the daughter of a farmer, at Cloonkeen, County Mayo, Ireland, and died on 20 May 2002. Theodore had the following issue:

John Theodore Stuart Verschoyle (18 February 1951 – August 1988)
Eileen O'Malley (born 1948)

John Theodore Stuart Verschoyle married Valerie Lockwood of Newark-on-Trent on 13 October 1979 and had the following issue:

 Luke John Verschoyle. Born 17 March 1981 at Nottingham Women's Hospital. Educated at Thomas Magnus Church of England School and Sheffield Hallam University (BSc human biology 2003).

Richard John Verschoyle (1824-1897) married Eliza Louisa Peed in New Ross Ireland 1858;
they had issue - William Denham Verschoyle (b. 1869 Ireland) married Iole Hylla Macdonell in Sligo 1910; their son Derek Hugo Verschoyle (1910-1973) studied under Evelyn Waugh at Aston Clinton, and became editor of the Spectator magazine.

The Verschoyle Patent Mandrel was invented by one of his relations, William Denham Verschoyle. Other notable relations are the Right Rev. Hamilton Verschoyle and his granddaughter Moira Verschoyle, Brian Goold-Verschoyle and Countess Markievicz, the latter being an officer in the Irish Citizen Army during the Irish Easter Uprising in 1916. Dermot Bolger has chronicled the stories of Markievicz and Goold-Verschoyle in his book The Family of Paradise Pier. This book is a fiction based on unverified facts.

References

 Burke's Landed Gentry for Ireland 1958 p728
 Burke's Irish Family Records 1976 p1163-1166
Entry on Lorenzo Hickie Jephson on www.familysearch.org
The Family on Paradise Pier, Dermot Bolger. p34

Irish families
Huguenot families
Irish people of Dutch descent
Families of Dutch ancestry